Firebomb may refer to:

 Firebombing
 Incendiary device
 Molotov cocktail
 A season 2 episode of the television show Alias
 "Firebomb", a song by Chrome from their 1982 album 3rd from the Sun
 "Fire Bomb", a song by Rihanna from her 2009 album Rated R